The Grand Duchy of the Lower Rhine, or simply known as the Lower Rhine Province, was a province of the Kingdom of Prussia and existed from 1815 to 1822.

History
The province was created after the Congress of Vienna in 1815, where Frederick William III was given the Rhineland and with it the title of Grand Duke of the Lower Rhine. This allowed Prussia to consolidate its Rhenish territories held since 1803, such as the Electorate of Trier, County of Manderscheid, Principality of Stavelot-Malmedy, the previously Free Imperial City of Aachen, parts of Luxembourg and Limburg, as well as a few other small territories. On 22 April 1816, these territories were combined to form the Grand Duchy of the Lower Rhine, with the provincial capital situated in Koblenz.

On 22 June 1822, by order of the Prussian cabinet, this province was fused with the neighbouring (lower) Province of Jülich-Cleves-Berg to form the Rhine Province, of which the former duchy was the upper part.

Provinces of Prussia
History of the Rhineland
Former states and territories of Rhineland-Palatinate
Former states and territories of North Rhine-Westphalia
1822 disestablishments in Prussia
1815 establishments in Prussia
Former grand duchies